Mark Leonard Bartchak (born January 1, 1955) is an American prelate of the Roman Catholic Church serving as bishop of the Diocese of Altoona-Johnstown in Pennsylvania since 2011.

Biography

Early life and education
Mark Bartchak was born on January 1, 1955, in Cleveland, Ohio, the fifth of eight children. He attended Catholic elementary and secondary schools, graduating in 1973 from Bradford Central Christian High School in Bradford, Pennsylvania. Bartchak's college studies were at St. Mark Seminary and Gannon University in Erie, Pennsylvania. where he received a Bachelor of Arts in philosophy in 1977. He also studied at Christ the King Seminary in East Aurora, New York, receiving a Master of Arts in theology in 1981.  Bartchak was ordained a deacon at Christ the King Seminary on September 22, 1980, and then assigned as deacon at St. Joseph Parish in Warren, Pennsylvania.

Ordination and ministry
Bartchak was ordained a priest for the Diocese of Erie on May 15, 1981, by Bishop Michael J. Murphy at St. Peter Cathedral in Erie.  After his ordination, Bartchak was assigned as temporary parochial vicar at St. Joseph Parish. In August 1981, he was named parochial vicar at St. Francis Parish in Clearfield, Pennsylvania. He also served as assistant principal and theology teacher at St. Francis High School in Clearfield and as part-time chaplain at the Clearfield Hospital.

Bartchak was transferred to St. Leo Magnus Parish in Ridgway, Pennsylvania, to serve as administrator of the parish for several months when the pastor became ill. He was then appointed parochial vicar at St. Leo Magnus. His duties included pastoral care at the Elk County General Hospital in St. Marys, Pennsylvania, and the Elk County Prison in Ridgway. In these early parish assignments he was active in local ecumenical clergy associations. He was a speaker at ecumenical and civic gatherings.

In 1982, Bartchak was appointed as part-time defender of the bond for the diocese and in 1986 he was assigned full-time to the diocesan tribunal.  Bartchak then attended the Catholic University of America School of Canon Law in Washington, D.C., where he received a Licentiate of Canon Law in 1989.  During his time in Washington, Bartchak assisted as a confessor at the Basilica of the National Shrine of the Immaculate Conception in Washington and at the U.S. Naval Academy in Annapolis, Maryland.

In August 1991, Bartchak was assigned to reside at St. Stanislaus Parish in Erie and provide weekend pastoral assistance. He received a Doctor of Canon Law from Catholic University in 1992.  That same year, Bartchak was appointed by Bishop Donald Trautman as judicial vicar and director of the Office of Conciliation & Arbitration of the diocese. In 2000, Pope John Paul II named Bartchak as chaplain to his holiness. In addition to these duties, he was named vicar for canonical affairs in 2004. Bartchak also served as an ex-officio member of the presbyteral council, the administrative cabinet and various diocesan committees. He served on the planning committee for the establishment of the permanent diaconate formation program for the diocese.

In 2004, Bartchak was appointed to the Administrative Board and the Executive Committee of the Pennsylvania Catholic Conference. In 2007 he was appointed as a consultant for the US Conference of Catholic Bishops  (USCCB) Committee on Canonical Affairs and Church Governance.

Handling of sexual abuse in Erie Diocese
A grand jury report published by Pennsylvania Attorney General Josh Shapiro on August 14, 2018, criticized Bartchak for his investigation of William Presley, a priest in the Diocese of Erie from 1963 and 1986. The Vatican assigned Bartchak in 2005 to investigate allegations of sexual abuse against minors by Presley.  Bartchak re-interviewed one male accuser who had sent accusations to the diocese in 1982, 1987 and 2002.

On August 25, 2005, Bartchak sent a secret memo to Bishop Trautman with his findings on Presley. Parts of the memo read "I was not surprised to learn from other witnesses from the Elk County area that there are likely to be other victims" and that "it is likely that there may be others who were also of the age for the offenses to be considered delicts, but to what end is it necessary to follow every lead?" Trautman decided that it was "not likely that they will lead to information concerning delicts involving minors under 16 years of age," Bartchak wrote.

Bishop of Altoona-Johnstown
On January 14, 2011, Bartchak was appointed by Pope Benedict XVI as bishop of the Diocese of Altoona-Johnstown; Bartchak was consecrated bishop by Cardinal Justin Rigali on April 19, 2011. Pope Francis named Bartchak a member of the Supreme Tribunal of the Apostolic Signatura on June 21, 2021.

On June 19, 2022, the diocese announced that Bartchak had tested positive for COVID-19, was experiencing mild symptoms, and was quarantining at home.

See also

 Catholic Church hierarchy
 Catholic Church in the United States
 Historical list of the Catholic bishops of the United States
 List of Catholic bishops of the United States
 Lists of patriarchs, archbishops, and bishops

References

External links 
Roman Catholic Diocese of Altoona-Johnstown Home Page
HISTORY OF SAINT STANISLAUS CATHOLIC CHURCH ERIE, PA

Episcopal succession

 

Religious leaders from Cleveland
1958 births
Living people
Catholic University of America School of Canon Law alumni
21st-century Roman Catholic bishops in the United States